The Nikon AF-S DX Zoom-Nikkor 16-85mm 3.5-5.6G IF-ED VR is a wide to medium telephoto zoom lens produced by Nikon Corporation for its Nikon DX format digital SLR cameras.

See also
List of Nikon compatible lenses with integrated autofocus-motor

References

External links
Nikkor AF-S 16-85mm f/3.5-5.6G ED VR DX - Review / Test Report

Nikon F-mount lenses